Hamed Rasouli (born 18 January 1985) is an Iranian football player. He currently plays for the IPL club PAS Hamedan as a striker.

Club career
A product of the Sepahan's youth system, Rasouli was drafted into the first team for the IPL 2006/07 season.

He played for Sepahan in the 2008 AFC Champions League group stages.

International career
Hamed Rasouli was a member of Iran national under-20 football team at the 2004 AFC Youth Championship

References

1985 births
Living people
Iranian footballers
Pas players
Sepahan S.C. footballers
Sepahan Novin players
Association football forwards